Lajos Sándor Nékám or Louis Nékám (June 4, 1868 – January 29, 1957) was a noted Hungarian dermatologist.

Selected publications
 Neurofibroma multiplex. Budapest, 1893
 Dolgozatok a fővárosi bakteriologiai intézetből. Budapest, 1897
 Über die leukaemischen Erkrankungen der Haut. Hamburg, 1899
 Magyar orvosi Vademecum. Budapest, 1902
 Corpus Iconum Morborum Cutaneorum. Budapest, 1938

References

External links
 

Hungarian dermatologists
1868 births
1957 deaths